"Chapter Four" is a song by American heavy metal band Avenged Sevenfold. The song was released as a double A-side single with "Eternal Rest" from their second album, Waking the Fallen, where it also appears as track three.

Background
The lyrics of "Chapter Four" are about the story of Cain and Abel. An early demo of the song was featured on the reissue of Waking The Fallen.  The song made its live debut during Warped Tour 2003.

Music video 
In 2014, the band released a music video for "Chapter Four" to promote the release of "Waking The Fallen: Resurrected". The video features clips of the band playing live, shot entirely in black and white. Footage from the same show was also used to film a music video for Unholy Confessions a decade prior. The video was directed by Rafa Alcantara.

Critical reception
"Chapter Four" is regarded as one of the best songs from the band's early days. In 2020, Louder Sound and Kerrang ranked the song at number thirteen and number fifteen, respectively, on their lists of the 20 greatest Avenged Sevenfold songs.

Track listings
CD Promo Single

Digital Promo

Personnel
Credits are adapted from the album's liner notes.

Avenged Sevenfold

 M. Shadows – lead vocals
 Zacky Vengeance – guitars, backing vocals
 The Rev – drums, percussion, backing vocals
 Synyster Gates – guitars, piano, backing vocals
 Johnny Christ – bass guitar, backing vocals

Production
 Andrew Murdock – producer, mixing engineer
 Fred Archambault – co-producer
 Ai Fujisaki – assistant engineer
 Tom Baker – mastering engineer
 Mike Fasano, Bruce Jacoby, Al Pahanish – drum tech
 Stephen Ferrara – guitar tech
 Scott Gilman – orchestral arrangements and performance

References

2003 songs
2003 singles
Avenged Sevenfold songs